Centre Township is a township in Marion County, Kansas, United States.  As of the 2010 census, the township population was 479, not including the city of Marion.

Geography
The Marion County Lake is located in the township.

Communities
The township contains the following settlements:
 City of Marion.
 Unincorporated community of Marion County Lake.

Cemeteries
The township contains the following cemeteries:
 Harter Cemetery, located in Section 26 T19S R4E.
 Highland Cemetery (aka Marion City Cemetery), located in Section 32 T20S R4E.

Transportation
U.S. Route 56 and U.S. Route 77 pass through the township.  K-256 and K-150 state highway connect in the township.

References

Further reading

External links
 Marion County website
 City-Data.com
 Marion County maps: Current, Historic, KDOT

Townships in Marion County, Kansas
Townships in Kansas